Paweł Jaroszek (born 7 January 1972) is a Polish speed skater. He competed at the 1992 Winter Olympics and the 1994 Winter Olympics.

References

External links
 

1972 births
Living people
Polish male speed skaters
Olympic speed skaters of Poland
Speed skaters at the 1992 Winter Olympics
Speed skaters at the 1994 Winter Olympics
People from Radom County
Sportspeople from Masovian Voivodeship